Kfarhata ( known also as Kfar Hata, Kafrhata) is a village located in the Zgharta District in the North Governorate of Lebanon. It is a mixed  Maronite Christian and Sunni Muslim community. 

It is home for the El Chemor family, once rulers of Zgharta Zawiyeh in the Ottomans era.

References

External links
Ehden Family Tree

Zgharta District
Populated places in the North Governorate
Sunni Muslim communities in Lebanon
Maronite Christian communities in Lebanon